The Stranger is a 1924 American silent drama film directed by Joseph Henabery and starring Betty Compson and Richard Dix. It is based on a 1918 novel, The First and the Last, by John Galsworthy. It was produced by Famous Players-Lasky and distributed through Paramount Pictures.

Plot
As described in a review of the film in a film magazine, just as Keith Darrant (Stone), a high-class Englishman, has a chance for political honors, his ne'er-do-well brother Larry (Dix) appears on the scene. Larry makes the acquaintance of Peggy Bowlin (Compson), a girl who is down and out, and a strong friendship begins. After a time Larry installs the girl in a better neighborhood and just as they are preparing to marry and leave England, a convict who blames her for his having to go to jail returns, and in a fight Larry accidentally kills him. "The Stranger" (Marshall), an outcast working in the saloon which the girl frequented, is arrested for the murder and refuses to say anything, fearing it will injure the girl’s new found happiness. The stranger is convicted and, as he is ready to pay the supreme penalty on the scaffold, Larry convinces Keith he must throw all considerations to the winds and save the old man. Just as they arrive on the scene, the thought of freedom is too much for the stranger. He collapses and dies, so the truth remains forever hidden and the happiness of the girl who has been kind to him is assured.

Cast

Preservation
With no prints of The Stranger located in any film archives, it is a lost film.

References

External links

1924 films
American silent feature films
Films directed by Joseph Henabery
Films based on British novels
Lost American films
Paramount Pictures films
Silent American drama films
1924 drama films
American black-and-white films
1924 lost films
Lost drama films
1920s American films